Joseph Strutt may refer to:

Joseph Strutt (engraver and antiquary) (1749–1802), English engraver and antiquary
Joseph Strutt (philanthropist) (1765–1844), Derby textile manufacturer and philanthropist
Joseph Strutt (MP) (1758–1845), British soldier and MP